François Berléand (born 22 April 1952) is a French actor.

He plays Gilles Triquet, the officer manager and equivalent of David Brent in Le Bureau, the French version of The Office, produced by Canal+. He also appeared in the 2002 film The Transporter as the French commissaire named Tarconi, an active and honest police officer who is an acquaintance of Frank Martin (Jason Statham). He reprised the role in the sequels Transporter 2 and Transporter 3 and the TV series.

Early life
Berléand was born in Paris, France. The son of an Armenian father and a French mother, until the age of eleven he found his childhood traumatic after being told by his father that Berléand was the son of the Invisible Man.

Career

While studying at business school, he trained as an actor, somewhat against his will; his first stage role was in a play called Sur une plage de l'Ouest (On a beach in the West). After graduation, he enrolled in drama classes with Tania Balachova and then met Daniel, a director under whose auspices he worked from 1974 to 1981, participating in a dozen productions, mainly of contemporary classics.

Berléand began his film career in 1978 with supporting roles in successful comedies throughout the 1980s. After a series of highly acclaimed supporting roles, including My Small Business for which he won the César for best actor in a supporting role in 2000, he won his first major role in the film My Idol by Guillaume Canet which brought his name and face to the wider public. For this, Berléand thanks his former girlfriend, actress-director Nicole Garcia.

In Martin et Léa, he plays a police inspector, a role he went on to perform many times on screen (La Balance, Les mois d'avril sont meurtriers (based on the novel The Devil's Home on Leave by Derek Raymond), Marche à l'ombre (Walking in the Shade), The Bait, The Death the Chinese, Fred, The Smile of the Clown, Ne le dis à personne (Tell No One), Transporter 1, 2, and 3) thanks in part to a cold, distant, and piercing gaze. Berléand often plays military characters (The Hostage of Europe, Stella, Les Milles, Captain Conan, The Prince of the Pacific); he has also played a detective (Follow This Plane), pastor (Au revoir les enfants) and psychiatrist in Seventh Heaven, the film that really showed his talents to the public in late 1997.

He released a book about his childhood in 2006, Le fils de l'homme invisible (The son of the invisible man).

Personal life
Berléand was in a relationship with French actress, film director and screenwriter Nicole Garcia for twelve years.

He has been in a long-term relationship with Alexia Stresi; their twins Adèle and Lucy were born in December 2008.

He is also the father of two grown children, Martin (born 1979) and Fanny (born 1983). He is the grandfather of Elios (born 2013), son of Martin.

Theater

Filmography

References

External links

 Le coin du cinéphage

1952 births
Living people
French people of Armenian descent
French male film actors
French male television actors
Ethnic Armenian male actors
20th-century French male actors
21st-century French male actors
Best Supporting Actor César Award winners
Officiers of the Légion d'honneur